Nasty Habits in Nice Children is the fifth studio album by Australian band The Radiators. The album was released in March 1987 and peaked at number 68 on the Australian Albums Chart.

Track listing

Charts

References

The Radiators (Australian band) albums
1987 albums
Mercury Records albums